Acantheis is a genus of Asian wandering spiders first described by Tamerlan Thorell in 1891.

Species
 it contains nine species:
Acantheis boetonensis (Strand, 1913) – Indonesia (Sulawesi)
Acantheis celer (Simon, 1897) – Indonesia (Java)
Acantheis dimidiatus (Thorell, 1890) – Indonesia (Sumatra)
Acantheis indicus Gravely, 1931 – India
Acantheis laetus (Thorell, 1890) – Borneo
Acantheis longiventris Simon, 1897 – Malaysia, Indonesia
Acantheis nipponicus Ono, 2008 – Japan
Acantheis oreus (Simon, 1901) – Malaysia
Acantheis variatus (Thorell, 1890) (type) – Indonesia (Nias Is.)

References

Araneomorphae genera
Ctenidae
Spiders of Asia
Taxa named by Tamerlan Thorell